The 2006 Big 12 Conference women's basketball championship, known for sponsorship reasons as the 2006 Phillips 66 Big 12 Women's Basketball Championship, was the 2006 edition of the Big 12 Conference's championship tournament.  The tournament was held at the Reunion Arena in Dallas from 7 March until 10 March 2006.  The Quarterfinals, Semifinals, and Finals were televised on the ESPN family of networks. The championship game, held on March 10, 2006, featured the number 1 seeded Oklahoma Sooners, and the number 2 seeded Baylor Bears. Oklahoma won this contest by a 72-61 score.

Seeding

Schedule

Tournament bracket

See also
2006 Big 12 Conference men's basketball tournament
2006 NCAA Women's Division I Basketball Tournament
2005–06 NCAA Division I women's basketball rankings

References

Big 12 Conference women's basketball tournament
Basketball in the Dallas–Fort Worth metroplex
Tournament
Big 12 Conference women's basketball tournament
Big 12 Conference women's basketball tournament